Ryan Anstey (born May 13, 1983) is a Canadian former professional soccer player. He played in 2006 for Toronto Lynx

Before turning pro Anstey played 5 years, in the Canadian Interuniversity Sport league (now U Sports), for the UPEI Panthers. Ryan's five years with the Panthers, he scored 43 career regular season goals, ranking him 3rd all-time in the conference behind Jeff Hibberts and Ross Webb, but first in his school's history.

In 2005 Anstey led the Nation in scoring with 15 goals in only 8 games played, winning by a 4-goal margin. He was named a First Team Conference All-Star for the third consecutive year. As well Anstey was named Atlantic conference MVP and was awarded the Joe Johnson Memorial Trophy as the Canadian Interuniversity Sport (U Sports) Player of the Year, making Anstey only the second Panther to receive the award after Glenn Miller in 1998. Shortly after his career ended at UPEI, his #10 jersey was retired by the University.

In 2006 Anstey signed a two-year contract with the Toronto Lynx of the USL First Division, he made his debut on Tuesday, July 11 against the Montreal Impact. He missed most of the season with injuries forcing him only to play 9 games. He also helped the Lynx to a team-record undefeated streak at home to 10 games, And reached the final of the Open Canada Cup.
 
In 2010 Anstey was a member of the Churchill Arms FC team that captured the Canadian National Challenge Cup at the BMO National Championships hosted in Charlottetown, Prince Edward Island. Anstey scored in extra time of the Gold Medal Match, to help Churchill Arms secure the national title. Churchill Arms was the first team from Prince Edward Island to win the National Championship.

Ryan Anstey graduated from UNB Law School in 2011.

In 2018 Ryan was inducted into the UPEI Hall of fame. 

Anstey is currently a Lawyer in Alberta, Canada.

External links
Lynx sign Ryan Anstey

Sources
www.unb.ca

1983 births
Association football forwards
Canadian soccer players
Living people
Soccer people from Prince Edward Island
Sportspeople from Charlottetown
Toronto Lynx players
University of New Brunswick alumni
UPEI Panthers soccer players
USL First Division players